Eupator is an epithet adopted by several Hellenistic rulers. The word Ευ·πατωρ literally means "of well (= noble) father".

Antiochus V Eupator
Mithridates VI Eupator
Ptolemy Eupator
Tiberius Julius Eupator

See also 
 Philopator (disambiguation)
 Philometor (disambiguation)
 Philadelphos (disambiguation)

Ancient Greek titles
Epithets